Posłoda  is a village in the administrative district of Gmina Lelów, within Częstochowa County, Silesian Voivodeship, in southern Poland.

References

Villages in Częstochowa County